Kunsthaus (German meaning "art house") may refer to:

Kunsthaus Graz
Kunsthaus Tacheles
KunstHausWien
Kunsthaus Zürich

See also 
 Art gallery
 Kunsthalle